Nathan Kreuger (born 25 June 1999) is an Australian rules footballer who currently plays with the Collingwood Football Club in the Australian Football League. He previously played two games with the  Football Club in 2021, having joined the club in 2018 when Carlton traded him to the Cats after selecting him as a pre-draft special assistance player.

AFL career

Kreuger was picked in a roundabout way in 2018 prior to the draft. The two bottom teams on the ladder that year  and  applied for priority picks in the National Draft, which the AFL denied. However,  were granted pre-draft access to up to three and  up to two mature-aged State League players each, these selections could be traded to other clubs. Carlton had traded one of their picks to Geelong.

Kreuger has the physical attributes to be a key forward, he spent his first two seasons developing his game in the VFL. He made his debut against  in Tasmania.
Kreuger, who was sought by the Magpies 12 months ago, so during the 2021 trade period Collingwood has received Kreuger and pick 55 in the upcoming AFL national in exchange for selection 41.

Statistics 
Updated to the end of the 2022 season.

|-
| 2019 ||  || 15
| 0 || – || – || – || – || – || – || – || – || – || – || – || – || – || –
|- 
| 2020 ||  || 15
| 0 || – || – || – || – || – || – || – || – || – || – || – || – || – || –
|-
| 2021 ||  || 15
| 2 || 0 || 0 || 11 || 4 || 15 || 7 || 8 || 0.0 || 0.0 || 5.5 || 2.0 || 7.5 || 3.5 || 4.0
|-
| 2022 ||  || 15
| 5 || 4 || 3 || 15 || 7 || 22 || 10 || 7 || 0.8 || 0.6 || 3.0 || 1.4 || 4.4 || 2.0 || 1.4
|- class=sortbottom
! colspan=3 | Career
! 7 !! 4 !! 3 !! 26 !! 11 !! 37 !! 17 !! 15 !! 0.6 !! 0.4 !! 3.7 !! 1.6 !! 5.3 !! 2.4 !! 2.1
|}

References

External links

1999 births
Living people
Indigenous Australian players of Australian rules football
Geelong Football Club players
Collingwood Football Club players
South Adelaide Football Club players
Australian rules footballers from South Australia